Iqlim al-Kharrub is a geographic region in the western part of the Chouf District. Its inhabitants are mostly Sunni Muslims.

Geographic definition
The Iqlim al-Kharrub is a historical and socio-cultural region in the western part of the Chouf District. Its territory is traditionally defined as the area between the Awali River in the south and the Damour River in the north. It extends from the Mediterranean Sea coast eastward into the Chouf mountains. There are 37 villages in the region, of which 25 are municipalities.

Etymology
The name Iqlim al-Kharrub means region of the carob.

History
The Iqlim al-Kharrub was a nahiye'' (subdistrict) of the Sidon-Beirut Sanjak during Ottoman rule.

Demography
Most of Iqlim al-Kharrub's population is Sunni Muslim and most Sunnis in the Chouf reside in the region. Unlike the rest of the Chouf where Druze form the demographic majority, there is no Druze population centers in the Iqlim al-Kharrub. The region's large villages are all Sunni majority, including Barja. Shia Muslims make up the majority of the small villages of Jiyyeh, Joun and Wardaniyeh.

The Maronite Christian population of the region, which is mostly resident in eleven small villages, has mostly diminished. This is largely due to two mass displacements during the Lebanese Civil War, the first in the wake of the Damour massacre by the Palestine Liberation Organization (PLO) and allied Lebanese National Movement (LNM) militias on January 10, 1976 and the second in the Mountain War in 1983–1984 when the Lebanese Armed Forces (LAF), Christian Tigers Militia and Lebanese Forces militias, respectively, were routed by the mainly Druze fighters of the People's Liberation Army (PLA) led by Walid Jumblatt. Christian–Druze antagonism has persisted in the Chouf since the end of the civil war in 1991 and Christians have not returned in significant numbers despite processes of reconciliation and compensation overseen by the Jumblatts and the Maronite Patriarch. Sectarian tensions though were not as high between Christians and Muslims in the Iqlim al-Kharrub.

Palestinian refugees present in the area since the 1948 Arab-Israeli war have substantially integrated with the Lebanese population, in contrast to elsewhere in Lebanon. There has also been an influx of Syrian refugees fleeing the Syrian Civil War. Many Lebanese in the Iqlim al-Kharrub moved to the area during and after the civil war in search for a lower cost of living, especially compared to housing prices in the capital Beirut.

Economy
The Iqlim al-Kharrub connects Beirut in the north with Sidon in the south. The main source of income is wage employment in the public sector, followed by employment in manufacturing and the tourism sector.

See also
Lebanese Civil War
Mountain War (Lebanon)

Notes

References

Bibliography

Chouf District
Regions of Lebanon